Angela Moore is an American politician serving as a Democratic member of the Georgia House of Representatives, representing District 90 since March 2021. She assumed office following a victory in a 2021 special election.

References

Democratic Party members of the Georgia House of Representatives
Women state legislators in Georgia (U.S. state)
Living people
21st-century American women
1962 births